A Working Man Can't Get Nowhere Today is the 26th studio album by American country singer Merle Haggard and The Strangers, released in 1977. Even though Haggard had moved to the MCA label, Capitol created this release from tracks previously recorded in 1975 and 1976.

Recording and composition
The album was the result of some shrewd marketing on Capitol's part, playing off Haggard's previous #1 hit "Workin' Man Blues" and his reputation as the "Poet of the Common Man" by dressing him up on the cover as a hardhat worker sitting at a bus stop with a lunch box and dangling cigarette.  The concept was timely, considering the Carter-era oil crisis that was engulfing the country, and is reflected in the self-penned title track.  Despite a short running time of twenty-four minutes, the assembled LP includes several high quality cuts that, remarkably, did not make their original albums.  Foremost of these is "Running Kind," a song that Haggard had recorded in Nashville in 1975 and would become a concert favorite.  In his 1999 memoir My House of Memories, Haggard titled one of the chapters after the song and stated, "I later wrote 'The Runnin' Kind,' a song that, in essence, says I've always been running, for no particular reason. There is a restlessness in my soul that I've never conquered..." Another outtake is "Goodbye Lefty," his touching tribute to his hero Lefty Frizzell, who died in 1975. "Blues for Dixie" and especially the cover of Hank Williams' "Moanin' the Blues" feature a breezy, feel-good energy that was largely absent on his final Capitol releases.  Perhaps the most curious track on the album is its closer "I'm a White Boy."  In his 2013 book on Haggard The Running Kind, biographer David Cantwell describes it as "an aggrieved-feeling white reply to James Brown's 'Say It Loud - I'm Black and I'm Proud,' with Haggard shouting "I'm proud! And white! And I got a song to sing!"

Reception

AllMusic critic Eugene Chadbourne stated in his review: "This is one of this country legend's well thought-out combinations of hardcore traditional material from Hank Williams and the Delmore Brothers, combined with his own brilliant songwriting from some of his tried and true perspectives..." Music critic Robert Christgau also rated the album highly, writing "These are powerful pieces whether you like them or not, rendered with passionate sympathy and a touch of distance—his strongest in years."

Track listing
"A Working Man Can't Get Nowhere Today" (Merle Haggard) – 2:55
"Making Believe" (Jimmy Work) – 3:02
"Blues Stay Away from Me" (Alton Delmore, Rabon Delmore, Henry Glover, Wayne Raney) – 2:16
"Got a Letter from My Kid" (Alex Kramer, Joan Whitney, Hy Zaret) – 2:29
"When My Last Song Is Sung" (Haggard) – 1:58
"Moanin' the Blues" (Hank Williams) – 2:03
"Goodbye Lefty" (Haggard) – 2:39
"Blues for Dixie" (O. W. Mayo) – 2:40
"Running Kind" (Haggard) – 3:00
"I'm a White Boy" (Haggard) – 2:05

Personnel
 Merle Haggard – vocals, guitar

The Strangers:
Roy Nichols – lead guitar
Norman Hamlet – steel guitar, dobro
 Tiny Moore – mandolin
 Ronnie Reno – guitar
 Mark Yeary – piano
 James Tittle – bass
Biff Adam – drums
Don Markham – saxophone

with
 Tommy Collins– guitar
 David Kirby – guitar
 Dennis Hromek – bass
 Johnny Gimble – fiddle

and
 Al Bruno - guitar
Hargus "Pig" Robbins – piano, organ
Glen D. Hardin – piano
 Bob Moore – bass

Chart positions

References

1977 albums
Merle Haggard albums
Capitol Records albums
Albums produced by Ken Nelson (United States record producer)